Camp Nichols, also known as Fort Nichols or Camp Nichols Ranch, was a short-lived historic fortification located in present-day Cimarron County, Oklahoma, about  northwest of the community of Wheeless, Oklahoma. It was built by New Mexico and California volunteers under the command of Col. Kit Carson to protect travelers on the most dangerous part of the Cimarron Cut-off of the Santa Fe Trail from raids by the Kiowa and Comanche Indians. Established in May 1865 and abandoned in September 1865, it was the only human-made structure along the Cimarron Cut-off while it was an active route. It is believed to have been named for Captain Charles P. Nichols of the First California Cavalry.

The site was about half way between Fort Union and the Cimarron Crossing of the Arkansas River. There were six stone buildings that served as officers' quarters, one building that was the quartermaster's store and an unknown number of stone walled tents housing the soldiers. The facility was surrounded by earth and stone breastworks. Only ruins remain; much of the stone has been removed by people wishing to use it in building other structures. The site is on private property and is not accessible to the public.

Cedar Spring, about 0.25 miles (0.4) km west of the fort, provided fresh water for the camp and for passing wagon trains.

The site was declared a National Historic Landmark in 1963 and subsequently listed on the National Register of Historic Places.

See also
List of National Historic Landmarks in Oklahoma
National Register of Historic Places listings in Cimarron County, Oklahoma

References

External links
 Camp Nichols; National Register Properties in Oklahoma
 Camp Nichols; Survey of Historic Sites and Buildings (NPS)
 Encyclopedia of Oklahoma History and Culture - Camp Nichols
 Oklahoma Digital Maps: Digital Collections of Oklahoma and Indian Territory

National Historic Landmarks in Oklahoma
Buildings and structures in Cimarron County, Oklahoma
Forts in Oklahoma
Santa Fe Trail
Native American history of Oklahoma
Pre-statehood history of Oklahoma
Nichols
1865 establishments in Indian Territory
1865 disestablishments in Indian Territory
National Register of Historic Places in Cimarron County, Oklahoma